No. 117 Squadron RAF was a Royal Air Force Squadron formed to be a bomber unit in World War I and reformed as a transport and communications unit in World War II.

History

Formation and World War I
No. 117 Squadron Royal Flying Corps was formed as a bomber squadron on 31 January 1918 and was based at RAF Wyton where it was equipped with the DH9. The squadron became part of the Royal Air Force and was stationed in Ireland for a time before it was merged with No. 141 squadron on 6 October 1919.

Reformation in World War II
No. 117 reformed on 30 April 1941 at Khartoum, Sudan and incorporated the Khartoum Communications Flight which already had a captured Italian Caproni Ca.148 aircraft that had been impressed into service in 1940. Needing a long range aircraft, four Bristol Bombays were borrowed from 216 Squadron and in May a flight of ex-Yugoslav Savoia-Marchetti S.79Ks were taken on charge. When the squadron moved to Egypt in November 1941 to provide transport services, the communications aircraft were left in Khartoum and the Bombays were returned. From November 1941 the whole squadron was equipped with the Lockheed Hudson. In 1943 it was involved in Operation Husky as part of No. 216 Group RAF and switched to Dakotas based at RAF Castel Benito, Libya. In October 1943 the squadron moved to India and in 1944 it transported supplies for the Chindits who operated behind the Japanese lines.

Post War
The squadron was disbanded on 17 December 1945 shortly after the war with Japan ended.

Aircraft operated
Data from unless otherwise specified

References

External links

 Squadron page on Official RAF website
 Squadron history on Air of Authority
 Squadron history on History of War

117
117
Military units and formations established in 1918
1918 establishments in the United Kingdom